Baja California ('Lower California') is a state in Mexico

Baja California may also refer to:

Places 
Baja California peninsula, in northwestern Mexico
Baja California Province (1773–1824), a former province
Baja California Territory (1824–1931), a former territory
Republic of Baja California, a proposed state 1853–1854
Baja California Desert, a desert ecoregion 
Baja California Sur, another state of Mexico

Other uses
Bajacalifornia, a genus of fish
, a patrol ship in the Mexican Navy

See also
Baja (disambiguation)
California (disambiguation)
Alta California (disambiguation)